Aechmea maasii is a species in the genus Aechmea. This species is endemic to Brazil, known from the States of Espírito Santo and Rio de Janeiro.

References

maasii
Flora of Brazil
Plants described in 1997